The 1973 Kansas City Chiefs season was the franchise's 4th season in the National Football League, the 11th as the Kansas City Chiefs, and the 14th overall. they finished with a 7–5–2 record and missed the playoffs for the second straight year.

The defense kept the club in contention thanks to a nucleus that still included the bulk of the squad's Super Bowl IV starters. Quarterback Mike Livingston started in a 23–13 Opening Day loss against the Los Angeles Rams on September 16, but Len Dawson returned to rally the club for three consecutive wins to get the club off to a 3–1 start for a third consecutive year. The aging Len Dawson made his final start of the year in a 23–14 loss at Buffalo on October 29 and was replaced for the remainder of the year by Livingston, beginning a string of three straight seasons in which both players split time at the position.

Livingston led the club to another three straight wins, putting the team in first place in mid-November with a 6–3–1 record. A 1–2–1 ledger over the season's final month ended the club's post-season aspirations as the team finished the year in a second-place tie with Denver at 7–5–2. Len Dawson became the second Chiefs player in as many years to win the NFL Man of the Year Award. Following Super Bowl VIII, The AFC-NFC Pro Bowl was held at Arrowhead Stadium on January 20 with the AFC claiming a 15–13 win thanks to five field goals from Miami placekicker Garo Yepremian.

Offseason

NFL Draft

Roster

Preseason

Regular season

Schedule

Standings

Game summaries

Week 1 vs. Los Angeles Rams

Week 2 at New England Patriots

Week 3 vs. Oakland Raiders

Week 4 vs. Denver Broncos

Week 5 at Green Bay Packers

Week 6 at Cincinnati Bengals

Week 7 at Buffalo Bills

Week 8 at San Diego Chargers

Week 9 vs Chicago Bears

Week 10 vs Houston Oilers

Week 11 at Denver Broncos

Week 12 vs Cleveland Browns

Week 13 at Oakland Raiders

Week 14 vs San Diego Chargers

References 

Kansas City Chiefs
Kansas City Chiefs seasons
Kansas